Hawkesbury is a Franco-Ontarian city in Prescott-Russell county in Eastern Ontario, Canada. The vast majority of its 10,550 inhabitants are francophone.

The Long-Sault Bridge links it to Grenville, Quebec to the north. This bridge, crossing Chenail Island, is the only interprovincial bridge between Ontario and Quebec east of Ottawa. Hawkesbury is about halfway between Ottawa and Montréal.

History
Founded in 1798, Hawkesbury was named after Charles Jenkinson, Baron Hawkesbury.

Thomas Mears and David Pattee, two Americans, entered into a partnership in 1805, in order to harness the power of the lower Ottawa River and built the first sawmill on the Upper Canada side of the river.  The town of Hawkesbury developed around this mill. Mears also built the Union, the Ottawa River's first steamer. Demand for timber during the Napoleonic Wars created a boom. The mill complex continued to grow for at least the next half century, and by 1870 it included 145 different saws and created over 35 million board feet of lumber per year.

Timber and pulp-and-paper industries have been supplanted by textiles, synthetic fibres, metal extrusions, steel, glass and plastics. Hawkesbury has also become the business and service centre of the county of Prescott-Russell, although recently Rockland has become the largest community. The Grenville Canal on the Quebec side of the Ottawa River opposite Hawkesbury was an important link in the river's transportation system.

Part of Hawkesbury was submerged by the Carillon Hydro-Québec dam built between 1950 and 1962, which called for the demolition of over 300 houses in and around Hawkesbury. New developments today are happening due to baby boomers from Ottawa, Montreal and area purchasing some of the many new condos in town.

Demographics

Languages
The 2006 census found that French was the mother tongue of 77% of the population, while English was the mother tongue of 16%.  A very high percentage (2.7%) claim both French and English as their mother tongues. In 2006, this was the highest proportion in Canada.

According to the 2011 census, the percentage of the population declaring solely French as a mother tongue grew to 78.6% while the proportion of the population declaring solely English as a mother tongue declined to 15.3%. The percentage claiming both French and English as their mother tongues declined below 2.00% by 2011.

Ethnocultural ancestries

In parallel to the responses to the census question about ethnocultural ancestries, which are shown below, 1.0% of the population also reported having an Aboriginal identity, while 3.1% reported having a visible minority status (including 2.0% who identified as South Asian).

Single responses: 42.4% of respondents gave a single response of 'Canadian', while a further 25.3% identified with both 'Canadian', and one or more other ancestries. 13.4% of respondents gave a single response of French, 1.9% gave a single response of Irish, 1.9% gave a single response of English and 1.1% gave a single response of North American Indian.

Multiple responses: Counting both single and multiple responses, the most commonly identified ethnocultural ancestries were:

 Percentages are calculated as a proportion of the total number of respondents and may total more than 100% due to dual responses. All ethnocultural ancestries of more than 1% are listed in the table above according to the exact terminology used by Statistics Canada.

Transportation

Hawkesbury is located along Prescott and Russell County Road 17, a former routing of Highway 17 and the Trans-Canada Highway with connects with Highway 417 eastwards to Montreal. Hawkesbury also connects to Highway 417 westward to Ottawa through a  spur of Highway 34.

The Long-Sault Interprovincial Bridge between Hawkesbury, Ontario, and Grenville, Quebec, means that Hawkesbury is within minutes of Highway 50 and Route 148 in Quebec.

The town is served by two small airports:

 Hawkesbury Airport
 Hawkesbury (East) Airport

Education

Hawkesbury hosts many establishments in the field of education, from elementary schools to colleges and an adult campus.

Elementary Schools:
 Paul VI
 Nouvel Horizon

Secondary Schools:
 ESCRH
 Le Sommet

Post-secondary establishments:
 La Cité collégiale
 Contact Nord

Other educational-based establishments:
 Adult Campus of Hawkesbury

Media

Hawkesbury and area are served primarily by local media, media from Montreal and by media from Ottawa. The town does, however, have four radio stations which broadcast at least partially from local studios in Hawkesbury.

Newspaper
Le Régional is a bilingual independent newspaper that covers the Prescott-Russell region and the municipalities of Grenville and Grenville-sur-la-Rouge in Québec.

Le Carillon, a French-language newspaper, and its bilingual supplement The Tribune Express that cover Hawkesbury and the Prescott-Russell region and are published by the Edition André Paquette Group.

The Review is an English-language weekly newspaper that covers the Glengarry-Prescott-Russell area, which includes Hawkesbury.

Radio
 FM 88.9 - CIMF-1
 FM 92.1 - CHOD-FM
 FM 102.1 - CHPR
 FM 107.7 - CKHK

Television
 Channel 39: CHLF-TV-2, TFO
 Channel 48: CICO-TV-96, TVOntario
 Cogeco cable 11: TVCogeco (community channel)

Notable people
 Linda Cardinal, political scientist
 Dominique Demers, writer 
 Brian Greenway, guitarist for Canadian rock bands Mashmakhan and April Wine.
 Judith Guichon (1947-), Lieutenant-governor of British Columbia
 Bob Hartley, professional ice hockey head coach, former NHL coach. The municipal arena bears his name.
 Yvan Joly, former NHL player
 Richard Nadeau, Former federal MP of the Bloc Québécois
 Stephen Warren, member of the Wisconsin State Assembly

See also 

List of francophone communities in Ontario

References

External links

 
Lower-tier municipalities in Ontario
Populated places established in 1798
Towns in Ontario